Pamphile Mihayo Kazembe (born 17 September 1976 in Lubumbashi) is a retired Congolese footballer, who last played for TP Mazembe as a midfielder. He is currently the coach at TP Mazembe.

Career
Mihayo played for TP Mazembe in the 2009 FIFA Club World Cup and captained them in the 2010 FIFA Club World Cup, where they reached the final losing 3–0 to Internazionale. In 2008, he had a trial with English Premier League side Arsenal FC.

References

External links

1976 births
Living people
People from Lubumbashi
Democratic Republic of the Congo footballers
Association football midfielders
TP Mazembe players
2011 African Nations Championship players
Democratic Republic of the Congo international footballers
Democratic Republic of the Congo A' international footballers